Ameles wadisirhani is a species of praying mantis found in Saudi Arabia.

References

wadisirhani
Mantodea of Asia
Insects of the Middle East
Insects described in 1982